Buakea kaeuae is a species of moth of the family Noctuidae. It is only known from two locations in Kenya.

The wingspan is 20–23 mm for males and 21–24 mm for females.

The larvae feed within the stem of Panicum maximum. Full-grown larvae reach a length of 30–35 mm.

References

Moths described in 2011
Xyleninae